The Temple of Venus Erycina (Latin: Aedes Veneris Erycinae) was a temple on the Capitoline Hill in Ancient Rome dedicated to Venus Erycina. This was an aspect of the goddess Venus.  Later this temple was probably called the Temple of the Capitoline Venus (Aedes Veneris Capitolinae).  There was another temple with the same name in Rome, the Temple of Venus Erycina (Quirinal Hill).

History 

The Temple of Venus Erycina on the Capitoline Hill was built by the dictator Quintus Fabius Maximus Verrucosus.  He was appointed dictator after the disastrous Battle of Trasimeno in 217 BC and promised this temple to Venus after consulting the Sibylline Books, hoping thereby to reverse his fate.  The temple was inaugurated in 215 BC. Livia Orestilla had Germanicus dedicated in the temple.

The temple was probably in the Area Capitolina, by the great Temple of Jupiter Optimus Maximus.

See also 
 Temple of Venus Erycina (Quirinal Hill)
 List of Ancient Roman temples

References

Further reading 
 Orlin, Eric. Temples, Religion, and Politics in the Roman Republic
 Gruen, Erich. Romans and Others. In Rosenstein and Morstein-Marx "A Companion to the Roman Republic" p. 466.

Venus Erycina
3rd-century BC religious buildings and structures
Temples of Venus